Streptomyces nitrosporeus is a bacterium species from the genus of Streptomyces which has been isolated from garden soil in Japan. Streptomyces nitrosporeus produces Benzastatin E, Benzastatin F, Benzastatin G Nitrosporeusine A and Nitrosporeusine B and the antibiotics nitrosporin and virantomycin and the inhibitor of angiotensin-converting enzyme foroxymithine. Streptomyces nitrosporeus can degrade cellulose.

Further reading

See also 
 List of Streptomyces species

References

External links
Type strain of Streptomyces nitrosporeus at BacDive -  the Bacterial Diversity Metadatabase

nitrosporeus
Bacteria described in 1952